Malcolm Sinclair is a name that may refer to

Malcolm Sinclair (Swedish nobleman) (1690–1739) whose assassination caused the Russo–Swedish War of 1741–1743
Malcolm Sinclair (politician) (b. 1948), British politician and member of the House of Lords
Malcolm Sinclair (actor) (b. 1950), English stage and television actor and president of Equity trade union